Tom O'Flaherty may refer to:
Tom Maidhc O'Flaherty, Irish Communist politician in the early 20th century
Tom O'Flaherty (rugby union), English rugby union player